Behind the Legend is  1972 anthology series based on the lives of various Australians hosted by Manning Clark.

It was originally called The History Makers.

References

External links
Behind the Legend at IMDb
Behind the Legend at AustLit

Australian Broadcasting Corporation original programming
Australian anthology television series
1972 Australian television series debuts